High Sheriff of Londonderry or High Sheriff of Derry can refer to:

High Sheriff of Londonderry City, with responsibilities in the city of Derry
High Sheriff of County Londonderry, with responsibilities in County Londonderry outside the city of Derry